The rusty-capped kingfisher or Palau kingfisher (Todiramphus pelewensis) is a species of bird in the family Alcedinidae.  It is endemic to Palau. The natural habitat of this species is subtropical or tropical moist lowland forests.  It was formerly considered to be a subspecies of the Micronesian kingfisher.

This is a brilliantly colored, medium-sized kingfisher. Adults are characterized by white underparts with long black eyestripes, while juveniles are cinnamon below. They have large laterally-flattened bills and dark legs. Kingfishers defend permanent territories as breeding pairs and family groups. Both sexes care for young, and some offspring remain with parents for extended periods.

Little has been published about the status of rusty-capped kingfisher populations, although the US Fish and Wildlife Service has bird survey data for the region.

References

Further reading
Fry, C.H., K. Fry, A. Harris. 1992. Kingfishers, Bee-eaters, and Rollers. Princeton University Press. Princeton, NJ.
Haig, S.M., J.D. Ballou, and N.J. Casna. 1995. Genetic identification of kin in Micronesian Kingfishers. Journal of Heredity  86: 423–431.
Pratt, H.D., P.L. Bruner, and D.G. Berrett. 1987. The Birds of Hawaii and the Tropical Pacific. Princeton University Press.  Princeton, NJ.
Kesler, D.C., and S.M. Haig. 2007. "Territoriality, prospecting, and dispersal in cooperatively breeding Micronesian Kingfishers." Auk 124:381-395.
Kesler, D.C., and S. M. Haig. 2005. "Microclimate and nest site selection in Micronesian kingfishers." Pacific Science 59:499-508.

Todiramphus
Birds described in 1891
Endemic birds of Palau
Taxa named by Lionel William Wiglesworth